Jutiapa is a city and a municipality in the Jutiapa department of Guatemala.
 
Located 124 km from the city of Guatemala City, at an altitude of 892 m (2,926 ft), it is the capital of the department of Jutiapa. Its Catedral San Cristóbal is the episcopal see of the Roman Catholic Diocese of San Francisco de Asís de Jutiapa since 2016.

Local crafts include candles (both tallow and paraffin type); woven hats and other palm products; leather saddles, belts and riding gear; and traditional ceramics.

Notable people 
 Angelina Acuña (1905-2006), writer

References 

Municipalities of the Jutiapa Department